Jacques de Mahieu, whose real name was Jacques Girault, (31 October 1915 – 4 October 1990) was a French Argentine anthropologist and Peronist.
He wrote several books on esoterism, which he mixed with anthropological theories inspired by scientific racism.

A collaborationist in Vichy France, he became a Peronist ideologue  in the 1950s, mentor to a Roman Catholic nationalist youth group in the 1960s, and later in life, head of the Argentine chapter of Spanish neo-Nazi group CEDADE.

Biography

Early life
Born in Marseille, as a young man Jacques de Mahieu was influenced by authors such as Georges Sorel, Charles Maurras, and Alexis Carrel and joined the Action Française.

During World War II, Jacques de Mahieu was a member of the Charlemagne Division.

After the liberation of France, he was one of the first to flee to Juan Perón's Argentina through the ratlines organized by Perón. A Naturalized Argentine, he became an ideologue of the Peronist movement, before becoming a mentor to a Roman Catholic nationalist youth group in the 1960s.

Academic career 
Jacques de Mahieu studied at the Universities of Mendoza and Buenos Aires; he graduated in philosophy, as doctor Honoris Causa of Medicine, doctor in economic sciences, and doctor in political science.

He became a professor of anthropological studies in Buenos Aires as the deputy rector of the Institute of Human Studies (from 1953 to 1955 and again from 1972 to 1976). He also taught economy, ethnography and French at the National University of Cuyo (1948–1955), and at the Universidad del Salvador (1964–1965).

He also was a member of the Academia Argentina de Sociología (1952–1955), and a lecturer with the Armed Forces of the Argentine Republic (1961–1971).

Later life and death
Jacques de Mahieu remained in Argentina in his later years. Uki Goñi claims that he was photographed with Carlos Menem during the latter's 1989 presidential campaign. Jacques de Mahieu headed the Argentine chapter of the Spanish neo-Nazi group, CEDADE, until his death in Buenos Aires, in 1990.

Pre-Columbian contact theories

De Mahieu wrote on pre-Columbian America and esoteric Nazism. He traveled to Paraguay for anthropological studies, and claimed the Guayaki tribes were descendants of the Vikings. 
He allegedly travelled to Brazil in 1974, where he visited the Sete Cidades park in Piauí and considered it a Viking establishment.
His books on the Knights Templar allege they settled in Mexico before Columbus.

Economic and political work
Beside anthropological interests, Mahieu also wrote about economy and state questions. He wrote a book titled The Communal Economy (1964), which was inspired by a social and economic project developed in Mendoza. The project ended during the Revolución Libertadora regime, which toppled Juan Perón's government in 1955.

Bibliography 
In French

In Spanish

References 

1915 births
1990 deaths
Argentine political scientists
French emigrants to Argentina
National University of Cuyo alumni
Naturalized citizens of Argentina
Nazis in South America
Neo-Nazism in Argentina
People affiliated with Action Française
Proponents of scientific racism
University of Buenos Aires alumni
French Waffen-SS personnel
Argentine fascists
Academic staff of the University of Buenos Aires
Esotericists
20th-century political scientists